Thomas Tomone is a fictional character in the E4 television series Skins. Thomas stands as being one of the only characters on the show who is not British-born, having originated from Sangha, Republic of the Congo; with his first language being French. He is a migrant who has recently arrived in Bristol, and is unused to the change in climate, and the British way of life. He became romantically involved with Pandora Moon. He is considerably kinder and more spiritual than most of the gang.

Characterisation
Thomas starts off the series being new to Britain and does not appear until the third episode of Series 3. Unlike the rest of the gang, into which he integrated via Pandora Moon and Effy Stonem, he is very friendly, honest and spiritual. Initially, he proves instrumental in getting the local gangster, Johnny White off the gang's back. Furthermore, he is one of the more popular members of the gang, consoling Emily whenever Naomi upsets her, making friends with JJ and helping him get his first girlfriend, and consoling Katie after she receives some bad news about her fertility. Thomas spends most of the series as Pandora's boyfriend, and, due to his working in a nightclub, he is able to get them into many raves and nightclubs throughout the series. His relationship with Pandora is troubled, and fraught with infidelity on both sides, which causes tensions throughout the series.

Thomas' family, like him, struggle with the cultural shift of moving to Britain, particularly his traditional mother, Kosoke, who is shocked by the rampant drug use and party-hard lifestyle of Thomas's friends, which she worries will rub off on him and his siblings. She also struggles with Thomas's increased willingness to challenge her. This proves difficult, especially as Thomas' brother, Daniel suffers from Cystic fibrosis, not helped by the damp and dusty apartment that they live in. Thomas' father is only mentioned once, when Kosoke brings him up in an argument with Thomas, and the mention of his father is enough to trigger the normally non-confrontational Thomas to explode at her that his father is dead, and of no use to them.

Character history

Series 3

Thomas' first appearance is in the third episode, "Thomas" wherein he has just arrived in Bristol from the Congo, with his family planning to join him in a few days. He is somewhat taken aback by the rudeness that meets him, and moves into a squalid and supposedly abandoned apartment in the city. After he fights off some boys who are terrorising a newsagent, he obtains some free doughnuts, and it is while he is eating them that he first meets Pandora and Effy, with whom he shares the doughnuts. After Pandora eats too many and is violently sick, he and Effy carry her home, to discover that Effy's mother is having an affair with her husband's boss. Later on, Thomas is woken in his apartment by Johnny White and his minions, who reveal that Thomas is, in fact, using their apartment without their permission. They demand that Thomas pay them back, or else risk eviction, with Johnny drinking some boiling pot noodles to threaten him.

Thomas finds employment at Roundview College, where Pandora and the gang attend. He starts to show signs of homesickness when Pandora encounters him after a dance class, which centred on Africa. She invites him over to her aunt's for tea and scones. The two discover that the "tea" is, in fact, cannabis, and plan to sell it to pay off Thomas' rent. The two then share a kiss in the greenhouse. After selling the weed on Johnny's turf, he challenges Thomas to a chilli eating competition. Little does he know, however, that the chillis he challenges Thomas to eat are, in fact, Thomas' favourite type, and after Thomas eats a massive handful, he wins the challenge. While celebrating the victory, Thomas enters his room to discover Pandora sitting on his bed in her underwear, in the hope that he will take her virginity. Before they can consummate, however, Thomas' mother, Kosoke arrives early and, seeing the lifestyle he is now in contact with, drags him back to the Congo, breaking his and Pandora's hearts.

Thomas later returns to Britain in "Pandora", unaware that Pandora lost her virginity to Cook only the night before. He gets a job in a nightclub and continues to see Pandora. However, in "JJ," Cook, after taking JJ's medication, accidentally reveals that he is continuing an affair with Pandora, in front of both Thomas and Freddie. At this point, Pandora isn't aware that Thomas knows about her infidelity. In "Effy", he watches Pandora speaking to Cook on the phone - however she pretends that she has been speaking to her mother and he does not challenge this, even though he knows that she is lying. Later on in the episode, Cook reveals to the whole gang (including his girlfriend Effy) that he and Pandora have been sleeping together. Pandora attempts to make up with Thomas but he states that he has already given her enough chances and that she is not the girl he fell in love with.

In "Katie and Emily," Thomas meets a tearful Emily, who has been having sex with Naomi, but left angrily without taking her shoes or coat, at a bus stop. He consoles her and gives her his jacket and shoes. Later on, he reconciles with Pandora at the school prom.

Series 4
Thomas's centric episode opens up the series when a local Army Cadet, Sophia, throws herself to her death at the nightclub in which Thomas works. Thomas suspects that she was high and that Cook sold her the drugs. In the aftermath, he is bribed to stay silent by the nightclub owner, although Kosoke is angry with him for accepting a bribe after such an event. After he is expelled from Roundview College and coming to blows with Cook, Thomas is depressed and distances himself from Pandora, developing a close proximity to the local African church instead. After Daniel suffers from his cystic fibrosis, Thomas has an angry confrontation with his mother, after she berates him for challenging her parenting technique and mentions his deceased father.

Thomas then proceeds to have sex with the daughter of the local Parish pastor. He feels guilty and reveals his infidelity to Pandora over a movie with JJ, and she breaks up with him. He does not pursue a relationship with the pastor's daughter, and instead resolves to use the bribe money to buy a new house and get a new job at a local confectionery store, which Kosoke appreciates. However, he continues to be rebuffed and ostracised by Pandora, who refuses to take him back.

In "Katie," Thomas attends a party at Emily and Naomi's house, and accidentally locks himself in the bathroom with a naked Katie in the bath. The two share a kiss, but do not pursue a relationship. Thomas consoles her after she admits to having had a premature menopause, and is no longer fertile. Katie leaves feeling angry at the way Pandora treats Thomas.

In "JJ," Thomas has replaced Freddie and Cook as a friend of JJ, who now works at the same confectionery store as Thomas. When Thomas urges JJ to ask out Lara Lloyd, a beautiful colleague, and threatens to ask her out himself, JJ manages to win her affections. 

In "Everyone," Thomas has taken up athletics, being a very fast runner. After his skill is spied on by a local trainer, Thomas is pushed into getting an athletics scholarship to Harvard University in the United States. He and Katie work towards getting Pandora back by pretending to be in a relationship, when he is, in fact, helping her with her French (French being his first language). At the end, it is revealed that Pandora is also going to Harvard after getting exceptional grades in her exams, and the two finally reconcile.

References

External links
Thomas Tomone on the official E4 Skins site
Thomas Tomone Character Blog on E4 Skins site
Thomas Tomone on Myspace

Skins (British TV series) characters
Fictional Republic of the Congo people
Fictional musicians
Television characters introduced in 2009
Fictional Black British people
Fictional English people
Male characters in television
Teenage characters in television
British male characters in television